Greta Marturano (born 14 June 1998) is an Italian professional racing cyclist who currently rides for UCI Women's Continental Team .

Major results
2018
 8th Time trial, National Road Championships
 9th SwissEver GP Cham-Hagendorn
2019
 9th Overall Giro delle Marche in Rosa
2020
 1st  Young rider classification, Setmana Ciclista Valenciana
 7th Time trial, National Road Championships
2021
 4th Grand Prix Féminin de Chambéry
 8th Overall Setmana Ciclista Valenciana
2022 
 7th Gran Premio della Liberazione
 9th Trofeo Oro in Euro–Women's Bike Race

References

External links
 

1998 births
Living people
Italian female cyclists
Place of birth missing (living people)
People from Cantù
Cyclists from the Province of Como